El camionero (lit: Truck Driver), is a Chilean television series that aired on TVN and TV Chile from August 15, 2016, to March 14, 2017, starring Marcelo Alonso, María Elena Swett, Pablo Cerda, and Angie Jibaja.

Plot 
Antonio Flores (Marcelo Alonso), is a loving and beloved man known in his community for driving a truck on Route 5. He has three siblings: a truck driver, a chef and a student. He did not go unnoticed among women. This free spirit, lives without major concerns until fate puts on its way to the only woman, Ema Kaulen (Mane Swett) could do give up the route.

Cast

Main characters 
 Marcelo Alonso as Antonio Flores Castillo.
 María Elena Swett as Ema Kaulen.
 Pablo Cerda as Genaro Echeverría.
 Magdalena Urra as Amparo Echeverria / Amparo Flores.
 Angie Jibaja as Ursula Porras Rojas.

Supporting characters 
 Carolina Arregui as Vilma Flores Castillo.
 Felipe Braun as Cristóbal Berenguer.
 Héctor Morales as Leonardo Flores.
 María José Prieto as Denise Cienfuegos.
 Luis Alarcón as Emeterio Pérez.
 Denise Rosenthal as Marcela Flores.
 Juan Falcón as Víctor Sanhueza.
 Matías Assler as Sebastián Cienfuegos.
 Belen Soto as Alejandra Sanhueza Flores.
 Raimundo Alcalde as Pablo Kaulen Barros.
 Nicole Block as Noemí Cardenas.
 Bastián Bodenhoffer as Felipe Cienfuegos. 
 Vicente Ortiz as Jorge Sanhueza Flores. 
 Amparo Noguera as Rosita Zaldivar.
 Luz Valdivieso as Katia Zaldivar.
 Mateo Iribarren as Ernesto.
 Alejandra Fosalba as Claudia.

References

External links 
  

2016 telenovelas
2016 Chilean television series debuts
Chilean telenovelas
Spanish-language telenovelas
Televisión Nacional de Chile telenovelas
Television shows set in Santiago
2017 Chilean television series endings